The Ramsar Convention on Wetlands of International Importance Especially as Waterfowl Habitat is an international treaty for the conservation and sustainable use of Ramsar sites (wetlands). It is also known as the Convention on Wetlands. It is named after the city of Ramsar in Iran, where the convention was signed in 1971.

Every three years, representatives of the contracting parties meet as the Conference of the Contracting Parties (COP), the policy-making organ of the convention which adopts decisions (resolutions and recommendations) to administer the work of the convention and improve the way in which the parties are able to implement its objectives. COP12 was held in Punta del Este, Uruguay, in 2015. COP13 was held in Dubai, United Arab Emirates, in October 2018.

List of wetlands of international importance

The countries with most sites are the United Kingdom with 175 and Mexico with 142.

The Ramsar Sites Information Service (RSIS) is a searchable database which provides information on each Ramsar site.

International cooperation

As of 2016 there are 18 transboundary Ramsar sites, and 15 Ramsar regional initiatives covering regions of the Mediterranean, Asia, Africa, and South America.

International organization partners 
The Ramsar Convention works closely with six other organisations known as international organization partners (IOPs). These are:
 BirdLife International
 International Union for Conservation of Nature (IUCN)
 International Water Management Institute (IWMI)
 Wetlands International
 WWF International
 Wildfowl & Wetlands Trust (WWT)
These organizations support the work of the convention by providing expert technical advice, helping implement field studies, and providing financial support. The IOPs also participate regularly as observers in all meetings of the conference of the parties and as full members of the Scientific and Technical Review Panel.

Other partners 
The convention collaborates with a network of partners:
 Biodiversity-related conventions including the Convention on Biological Diversity (CBD), the Convention to Combat Desertification (UNCCD), Convention on Migratory Species (CMS), the World Heritage Convention (WHC), and the Convention on International Trade in Endangered Species (CITES);
 Project funding bodies including global environmental funds, multilateral development banks and bilateral donors;
UN agencies such as UNEP, UNDP, UNESCO, and the UN Economic Commission for Europe, and specific programmes such as UNESCO's Man and the Biosphere Programme (MAB);
 Non-governmental organizations including the Nature Conservancy, Conservation International, the Society of Wetland Scientists, the International Association for Impact Assessment, and many others;
 Since 1998 the convention has also benefited from a strong partnership with Danone including the Évian brand, and since 2007 from the Biosphere Connections partnership with the Star Alliance airline network.

Bodies established by the convention

Conference of the Contracting Parties 
This is the convention's governing body consisting of all governments that have ratified the treaty. This ultimate authority reviews progress under the convention, identifies new priorities, and sets work plans for members. The COP can also make amendments to the convention, create expert advisory bodies, review progress reports by member nations, and collaborate with other international organizations and agreements.

The Standing Committee 
The Standing Committee is the intersessional executive body which represents the COP between its triennial meetings, within the framework of the decisions made by the COP. The contracting parties that are members of the Standing Committee are elected by each meeting of the COP to serve for the three years.

The Scientific and Technical Review Panel 
The Scientific and Technical Review Panel (STRP) provides scientific and technical guidance to the Conference of Contracting Parties, the Standing Committee, and the Ramsar Secretariat.

The Secretariat 
The Secretariat carries out the day-to-day coordination of the convention's activities. It is based at the headquarters of the International Union for Conservation of Nature (IUCN) in Gland, Switzerland.

The implementation of the Ramsar Convention is a continuing partnership between the Conference of Contracting Parties, the Standing Committee, and the Secretariat, with the advice of the subsidiary expert body, the Scientific and Technical Review Panel (STRP), and the support of the international organization partners (IOPs).

Dr Musonda Mumba is the seventh secretary general of the Ramsar Convention on Wetlands.

World Wetlands Day 

February 2 is World Wetlands Day, marking the convention's adoption on 2 February 1971. Established to raise awareness about the value of wetlands for humanity and the planet, WWD was celebrated for the first time in 1997, and has grown since then. In 2015 World Wetlands Day was celebrated in 59 countries.

History 
The convention was co-founded by Eskandar Firouz (former environment minister of Iran), Luc Hoffmann of Tour du Valat research station in the Camargue in France, and Geoffrey Matthews of the Wildfowl & Wetlands Trust at Slimbridge in the late 1960s. The conference, which adopted the terms of the agreement, was held in the Iranian Caspian Sea resort of Ramsar on 2 February 1971. The convention turned 50 in 2021.

Implementation 
Despite its quasi-universal application, the domestic response to this treaty is often half-hearted and inadequate. By way of example, Germany joined the Convention in 1976 and has, "to date, failed to give effect to the Ramsar Convention in the manner set out by the constitution of Germany."

See also 
 Ramsar classification system
 Montreux Record - threat classification for wetlands
 Ramsar Wetland Conservation Award
 List of international environmental agreements
 World Heritage Site - international agreement on historic site recognition

References

External links

 
 World Wetlands Day

 
Environmental treaties
UNESCO treaties
Treaties concluded in 1971
Treaties entered into force in 1975
1971 in the environment
1975 in the environment
1971 in Iran
Wetland conservation
Wildlife law
Treaties of Albania
Treaties of Algeria
Treaties of Andorra
Treaties of Antigua and Barbuda
Treaties of Argentina
Treaties of Armenia
Treaties of Australia
Treaties of Austria
Treaties of Azerbaijan
Treaties of the Bahamas
Treaties of Bahrain
Treaties of Bangladesh
Treaties of Barbados
Treaties of Belarus
Treaties of Belgium
Treaties of Belize
Treaties of Benin
Treaties of Bhutan
Treaties of Bolivia
Treaties of Bosnia and Herzegovina
Treaties of Botswana
Treaties of Brazil
Treaties of the People's Republic of Bulgaria
Treaties of Burkina Faso
Treaties of Burundi
Treaties of Cambodia
Treaties of Cameroon
Treaties of Canada
Treaties of Cape Verde
Treaties of the Central African Republic
Treaties of Chad
Treaties of Chile
Treaties of the People's Republic of China
Treaties of Colombia
Treaties of the Comoros
Treaties of the Republic of the Congo
Treaties of Croatia
Treaties of Cuba
Treaties of Cyprus
Treaties of the Czech Republic
Treaties of Denmark
Treaties of Djibouti
Treaties of the Dominican Republic
Treaties of Ecuador
Treaties of Egypt
Treaties of El Salvador
Treaties of Equatorial Guinea
Treaties of Estonia
Treaties of Fiji
Treaties of Finland
Treaties of France
Treaties of Gabon
Treaties of the Gambia
Treaties of Georgia (country)
Treaties of Ghana
Treaties of Greece
Treaties of Grenada
Treaties of Guatemala
Treaties of Guinea
Treaties of Guinea-Bissau
Treaties of Honduras
Treaties of the Hungarian People's Republic
Treaties of Iceland
Treaties of India
Treaties of Indonesia
Treaties of Iraq
Treaties of Ireland
Treaties of Israel
Treaties of Italy
Treaties of Ivory Coast
Treaties of Jamaica
Treaties of Japan
Treaties of Jordan
Treaties of Kazakhstan
Treaties of Kenya
Treaties of Kiribati
Treaties of Kuwait
Treaties of Kyrgyzstan
Treaties of Laos
Treaties of Latvia
Treaties of Lebanon
Treaties of Lesotho
Treaties of Liberia
Treaties of the Libyan Arab Jamahiriya
Treaties of Liechtenstein
Treaties of Lithuania
Treaties of Luxembourg
Treaties of North Macedonia
Treaties of Madagascar
Treaties of Malawi
Treaties of Malaysia
Treaties of Mali
Treaties of Malta
Treaties of the Marshall Islands
Treaties of Mauritania
Treaties of Mauritius
Treaties of Mexico
Treaties of Moldova
Treaties of Monaco
Treaties of Mongolia
Treaties of Montenegro
Treaties of Morocco
Treaties of Mozambique
Treaties of Myanmar
Treaties of Namibia
Treaties of Nepal
Treaties of the Netherlands
Treaties of New Zealand
Treaties of Nicaragua
Treaties of Niger
Treaties of Nigeria
Treaties of North Korea
Treaties of Norway
Treaties of Oman
Treaties of Pahlavi Iran
Treaties of Pakistan
Treaties of Palau
Treaties of Panama
Treaties of Papua New Guinea
Treaties of Paraguay
Treaties of Peru
Treaties of the Philippines
Treaties of the Polish People's Republic
Treaties of Portugal
Treaties of Romania
Treaties of the Soviet Union
Treaties of Rwanda
Treaties of Saint Lucia
Treaties of Samoa
Treaties of São Tomé and Príncipe
Treaties of Senegal
Treaties of Serbia and Montenegro
Treaties of Seychelles
Treaties of Sierra Leone
Treaties of Slovakia
Treaties of Slovenia
Treaties of South Africa
Treaties of South Korea
Treaties of South Sudan
Treaties of Spain
Treaties of Sri Lanka
Treaties of the Republic of the Sudan (1985–2011)
Treaties of Suriname
Treaties of Eswatini
Treaties of Sweden
Treaties of Switzerland
Treaties of Syria
Treaties of Tajikistan
Treaties of Tanzania
Treaties of Thailand
Treaties of Togo
Treaties of Trinidad and Tobago
Treaties of Tunisia
Treaties of Turkey
Treaties of Turkmenistan
Treaties of Uganda
Treaties of Ukraine
Treaties of the United Arab Emirates
Treaties of the United Kingdom
Treaties of the United States
Treaties of Uruguay
Treaties of Uzbekistan
Treaties of Venezuela
Treaties of Vietnam
Treaties of West Germany
Treaties of Yemen
Treaties of Zaire
Treaties of Zambia
Treaties of Zimbabwe
Treaties extended to Akrotiri and Dhekelia
Treaties extended to Aruba
Treaties extended to Bermuda
Treaties extended to British Antigua and Barbuda
Treaties extended to British Honduras
Treaties extended to British Hong Kong
Treaties extended to the British Indian Ocean Territory
Treaties extended to the British Solomon Islands
Treaties extended to Brunei (protectorate)
Treaties extended to the Cayman Islands
Treaties extended to the Cook Islands
Treaties extended to the Falkland Islands
Treaties extended to the Faroe Islands
Treaties extended to Gibraltar
Treaties extended to Greenland
Treaties extended to Guernsey
Treaties extended to Jersey
Treaties extended to Montserrat
Treaties extended to the Netherlands Antilles
Treaties extended to Niue
Treaties extended to the Pitcairn Islands
Treaties extended to Saint Helena, Ascension and Tristan da Cunha
Treaties extended to Tokelau
Treaties extended to the Turks and Caicos Islands
Treaties extended to West Berlin